The 2008 ARCA Re/Max Series was the 56th season of the ARCA Racing Series. The season began on February 9, 2008 at Daytona International Speedway with the Daytona ARCA 200 and ended on October 12, 2008 at Toledo Speedway with the Hantz Group 200. Justin Allgaier, driving for his family team, Allgaier Motorsports, won the season championship. Frank Kimmel, who won the series championship in nine of the previous ten seasons, barely lost the title this season to Allgaier. Kimmel had moved from the No. 46 Clement Racing car, which he won all of his titles in, to the No. 44 car for his family team this season. Kimmel's replacement in the No. 46, Matt Carter, would finish third in the championship.

Teams and drivers

Schedule

Results

Races

Point Standings

ARCARacing.com

Full Drivers' Championship
(key) Bold – Pole position awarded by time. Italics – Pole position set by final practice results or rainout. * – Most laps led.

References

ARCA Menards Series seasons
Arca Remax Series